Victor Nsofor Obinna (born 25 March 1987) is a Nigerian former professional footballer who played as a striker.

Obinna in Igbo, literally means "father's heart". He played for Chievo in Italy's Serie B, having played regularly in Serie A with the club until their relegation in 2007. He made his full international debut for Nigeria at the 2006 African Cup of Nations, scoring once in three appearances as his side were eliminated in the semi-finals.

Club career

Early career
Obinna played for Nigerian clubs Plateau United and Kwara United, he went on trials with Italian clubs Internazionale, Perugia and Juventus before signing with Brazilian club Internacional, but international clearance problems meant that the transfer was never finalised. He rejoined Enyimba to take part in their domestic league campaign and CAF Champions League defence.

Chievo
Obinna was signed by Italian club Chievo on a five-year contract in July 2005. But also reported that Chievo formed an agreement with Internazionale that Obinna first registered as Chievo player in order to use the non-EU registration quota of Chievo, like Júlio César in the 2004–05 season. Then he would be call back to Inter.

In his first season with Chievo, Obinna scored six goals in 26 games, including a goal on his Serie A debut against Parma in a 1–0 win, 11 September 2005. In the first months of the 2006 season, Obinna was suspended for having signed a contract with both Internacional and Chievo in 2005. Chievo were relegated at the end of the 2006–07 season, casting some doubt over Obinna's future; the club chose to keep Obinna in the squad to help gain promotion back to Serie A.

On 4 October 2007, Obinna was involved in a car accident on his way home from training in which he swerved away from a vehicle that had tried to overtake him around a bend. He escaped with only a few cuts and bruises. The car flipped several times and was heavily damaged. He lost consciousness and was taken to hospital. The accident occurred only a few hundred yards away from where former Chievo player Jason Mayélé was killed in a car accident in 2002.

Internazionale

In the summer of 2008, Obinna moved back to Inter for a €1.2 million transfer fee in a three-year contract. English club Everton attempted to immediately sign him on loan, but were unable to secure a work permit for the player. Obinna's first goal for Inter came on 19 October in a 4–0 win over Roma. Internazionale coach José Mourinho described Obinna as one of Inter's best talents for the future.

Málaga
On 26 August 2009, Spanish La Liga side Málaga signed Obinna on a season-long loan. He scored his first goal for the Andalusian club on 4 October in 1–1 a draw against Xerez, a match in which he was also sent off.

West Ham United
On 27 August 2010, Obinna signed for West Ham United on a season-long loan with the option of a permanent deal in 2011. He made his debut for West Ham on 11 September in a 3–1 home defeat to Chelsea. He scored his first goal for West Ham in a 2–1 win against Sunderland in the third round of the League Cup at the Stadium of Light on 21 September 2010. He scored his first league goal in 3–1 win against Wigan Athletic on 27 November 2010. He continued the fine form with four assists in a 4–0 win against Manchester United on 30 November 2010, automatically booking a first League Cup semi-final for 20 years.

Obinna was sent off during West Ham's semi-final, first leg match on 11 January 2011 against Birmingham City for an off the ball challenge on Sebastian Larsson with West Ham having conceded an equaliser just minutes earlier. On 30 January, Obinna scored a hat-trick in a FA Cup 4th round tie against Nottingham Forest, leading West Ham to a 3–2 victory. He followed that up three days later with two goals as West Ham beat Blackpool 3–1 at Bloomfield Road.

Lokomotiv Moscow
On 19 June 2011, Obinna signed a four-year deal with Lokomotiv Moscow on a free transfer.

MSV Duisburg
Obinna joined MSV Duisburg on 9 September 2015 for the 2015–16 season.

Darmstadt
He joined SV Darmstadt on 5 August 2016. He was released on 31 January 2017.

Cape Town City
In September 2017, Obinna signed for Premier Soccer League side Cape Town City. At the time of signing, the club were managed by former West Ham teammate Benni McCarthy.

International career
Obinna was a member of the U-20 Flying Eagles that won the gold in Benin in the African Youth Tournament in 2005 he was called up to the Nigerian senior squad at the 2006 African Cup of Nations, scoring once before his side's semifinal elimination.

In August 2008, he was named amongst Nigeria's squad for the 2008 Summer Olympics in Beijing. Obinna scored Nigeria's first goal in a 2–1 win against Japan the "Dream Team IV" winning goal in the final group match against the United States, ensuring that Nigeria qualified for the quarter-finals. Nigeria were drawn against Ivory Coast who they beat 2–0, with Obinna scoring a penalty and setting up Peter Odemwingie for the other goal. He later captained the Nigerian team when they beat Belgium 4–1 in the semi-final match, before losing to Argentina in the final.

Career statistics

Club
Source:

International
Source:

Honours
Chievo
 Serie B: 2007–08

Internazionale
 Serie A: 2008–09
Nigeria U23

 Summer Olympics runner-up: 2008

Nigeria
Africa Cup of Nations third place: 2010

References

External links

 
 
 
 
 Player profile – Victor Obinna Premier League

Living people
1988 births
Igbo sportspeople
Sportspeople from Jos
Association football forwards
Nigerian footballers
Nigeria international footballers
Nigerian expatriate footballers
Expatriate footballers in Italy
Expatriate footballers in Spain
A.C. ChievoVerona players
Inter Milan players
Málaga CF players
Serie A players
Serie B players
La Liga players
Footballers at the 2008 Summer Olympics
Olympic footballers of Nigeria
Kwara United F.C. players
Olympic silver medalists for Nigeria
2006 Africa Cup of Nations players
2008 Africa Cup of Nations players
2010 Africa Cup of Nations players
Plateau United F.C. players
2010 FIFA World Cup players
West Ham United F.C. players
Premier League players
FC Lokomotiv Moscow players
MSV Duisburg players
SV Darmstadt 98 players
Cape Town City F.C. (2016) players
2. Bundesliga players
Bundesliga players
Olympic medalists in football
Expatriate footballers in Russia
Russian Premier League players
Medalists at the 2008 Summer Olympics
Expatriate footballers in Germany
Nigerian expatriate sportspeople in Germany